Toilet humour, or potty or scatological humour (compare scatology), is a type of off-colour humour dealing with defecation, diarrhea, constipation, urination and flatulence, and to a lesser extent vomiting and other bodily functions. It sees substantial crossover with sexual humour, such as dick jokes.

Toilet humour is commonly an interest of children and young teenagers, for whom cultural taboos related to acknowledgement of waste excretion still have a degree of novelty. The humour comes from the rejection of such taboos, and is a part of modern culture.

Music
Toilet humour is sometimes found in song and rhyme, particularly schoolboy songs. Examples of this are found in Mozart and scatology, and variants of the German folk schoolboys' song known as the Scheiße-Lied (English: "Shit-Song") which is indexed in the German Volksliederarchiv. A children's Spanish musical duo, Enrique y Ana, made a song called "Caca Culo Pedo Pis", which literally translates to "Poop Butt Fart Pee".

American musician Matt Farley is known for writing and performing a multitude of songs related to urine, feces, vomit, and various other bodily fluids under the pseudonym The Toilet Bowl Cleaners, including one of his most popular songs entitled "Poop In My Fingernails".
Farley has another pseudonym, The Odd Man Who Sings About Poop, Puke, and Pee.

Detroit rapper Eminem famously utilises crude humour throughout his discography. His most notorious example of toilet humour was featured on the 2017 album Revival, where he raps "Your booty is heavy duty, like diarrhoea", a line which received extensive lament from critics. The Los Angeles Times comments: "If Hannibal Lecter could have recorded a rap album, this would have been it. Brilliant, sinister, scatological and a parent's nightmare."

Performance
Paul Oldfield, who performed under the name Mr Methane, performed a stage act that included him farting the notes of music. Joseph Pujol, who performed under the name Le Pétomane (French for "fart maniac"), performed a similar stage act for the Paris music hall scene.

Books
One of the most popular books about defecation and accidents in toilets is a guide that began as Shitting Pretty and then was relaunched as How to Shit around the World.

The children's book series Captain Underpants makes copious use of toilet humor. "Doctor Diaper", "The Bionic Booger Boy", and "Professor Pippy Pee-Pee Poopypants" are among the villains in the series.

Television
The American comedy duo Tim & Eric have made numerous comedy sketches based around toilet humour. For example, they have made fake commercials for non-existent products such as the "Poop Tube" (a device that lets people release liquefied faecal matter into a urinal while standing up), the "fla'Hat" (a hat that is connected to the wearer's anus which expands when storing flatulence), and "D-Pants" (an undergarment invented by "Diah Riha-Jones" that captures "uncontrollable diarrhea").

In the series South Park, the Canadian comedy duo Terrance and Phillip are noted for toilet humor and often make comedic use of their flatulence e.g. in the song ‘Unclefucker’.

English actor Adrian Edmondson, who appeared in many shows utilising toilet humour, is quoted as saying, "Toilet humour is like jazz: everybody has an idea what it is, and most people don't like it. But the people who do like it are fervent about it and like it until they die."

Video games
A game notorious for its juvenile humour, Conker's Bad Fur Day contains a plentiful amount of scatological jokes. One of the landmark areas is a "Poo Mountain" and some of its missions involve getting cows to drink a laxative prune juice to produce "pooballs", or fighting The Great Mighty Poo, a giant opera-singing pile of feces as a boss. In a later mission, the game's protagonist also has urination as an attack, after drinking a lot of beer and getting drunk.

Toilet humour is also versatile in the Metal Gear franchise. Solid Snake can protect himself from wolf attacks by having one urinate on him. In Metal Gear Solid 2: Sons of Liberty, Solid Snake can spot soldiers relieving themselves several times and also stand under them. In Metal Gear Rising: Revengeance, Raiden is instructed in order to use a terminal, he first needs to "take a DOOMP", which is an abbreviation for "digital-optical output mounted proxy".

A trait of Wario from the eponymous spin-off franchise is a powerful flatulence attack extensively used in his Super Smash Bros. appearance.

Toys
The Moose Toys franchise Little Live "Gotta Go" Pets is a toy line of interactive plush animals that "poop" when fed colourful sand. The toys make graphic noises of passing gas, panic and say the words "uh-oh! Gotta go!" and have scatological names including "turdle" (turtle). The internet critic Doug Walker called the toys "disgusting" and found them immature and inappropriate. Parenting blogs praised the toy line for its crude humour approach to potty training.

Mattel fashion doll Barbie has a plastic golden retriever, named Tanner, which has been an available toy in different variations since the 1990s. Tanner the dog eats brown bean-like beads and then poops them out when its tail is pressed. Barbie can then pick up the plastic poop with a scooper that comes with the playsets.

Infant dolls, typically targeted towards little girls, have existed for decades that urinate and defecate (into diapers or potties) as a play feature. Variants include "Magic Potty Baby" (a 1990s Tyco brand doll) and "Baby Alive" (and Amazon knock-off counterfeit variants) that pee, poop and release glitter from their rear ends. The trend of scatological dolls for girls was mocked on the 1970s British comedy TV series Are You Being Served? in the episode "A Change Is as Good as a Rest"; salesman Mr. Lucas fills Ms. Brahms's peeing dollies with fizzy carbonated lemonade; another gag features character Mrs. Slocombe displaying two doll variants to a customer: the one manufactured in Britain is blonde-haired and says "I want to go to the potty" when a string on its back is pulled, while a similar doll with sandy hair manufactured in India says "my name is Yasmin, and I have just been to the potty" when its string is pulled.

See also 

 Bum trilogy
 Dick joke
 Flatulence humour
 Gross out
 Grotesque body
 Interactive urinal
 Le Pétomane
 Lighting farts
 Mr. Methane
 Roland the Farter
 Scatology
 Sophomoric humour
Whoopee cushion

Notes

References

Henderson, Jeffrey The Maculate Muse: Obscene Language in Attic Comedy 1991 Oxford University Press 
Slater, W. J. review of The Maculate Muse: Obscene Language in Attic Comedy by Jeffrey Henderson. Phoenix, Vol. 30, No. 3 (Autumn, 1976), pp. 291–293 

Humour
Toilets
Vomiting
Euphemisms